The Singing Fool is a 1928 American musical drama part-talkie motion picture directed by Lloyd Bacon which was released by Warner Bros. The film stars Al Jolson and is a follow-up to his previous film, The Jazz Singer. It is credited with helping to cement the popularity of American films of both sound and the musical genre.

Plot
After years of hopeful struggle, Al Stone (Jolson) is on his way to stardom. He plays a blackface minstrel.

"I'm Sittin' on Top of the World", he sings to an appreciative speakeasy crowd.  But, as Al discovers, getting there is one thing.  Staying there is another. Singing waiter Stone gets his huge break on a magical night when his song wows a big-time producer and a gold-digging showgirl he fancies.  Broadway success and marriage follow, but sure enough, hard times are on the way. Al's fickle wife abandons him, taking the beloved son he calls Sonny Boy with her.  Heartbroken, Al becomes a devastated loner until friends from the speakeasy that launched his career rescue him from a life on the streets. Soon, Al is back in lights. But another crisis awaits: Sonny Boy is in the hospital and dying.

Cast
Al Jolson as Al Stone
Betty Bronson as Grace
Josephine Dunn as Molly Winton
Arthur Housman as Blackie Joe
Reed Howes as John Perry
Davey Lee as Sonny Boy
Edward Martindel as Louis Marcus
Robert Emmett O'Connor as Bill, cafe owner
Helen Lynch as Maid
Agnes Franey as "Balloon" girl
The Yacht Club Boys as Singing quartet
Jack Stoutenburg (uncredited)
Carl M. Leviness as Carl, a Waiter at Clicquot Club (uncredited)
William H. O'Brien as Waiter at Blackie Joe's (uncredited)
Bob Perry as Doorman at Blackie Joe's (uncredited)

Production
Like The Jazz Singer, The Singing Fool was a melodrama with musical interludes, and as such was one of the film industry's first musical films. Produced during the transition period between silent film and talkies, the movie was released in both sound and silent versions.

The Singing Fool was a part-talking feature, which featured a synchronized musical score with sound effects along with synchronized musical and talking sequences, although in this film roughly 66 minutes of talking and singing were included. Al Jolson's first all-talking feature, Say It With Songs, would appear in 1929.

Reception
The Singing Fool solidified Jolson's position atop the movie world; not until Snow White and the Seven Dwarfs would any sound-era film be more financially successful than this audience-pleasing blend of sentiment and show biz. With a worldwide gross of $5.9 million, it would remain the most successful film in Warner Bros. history until the release of Sergeant York in 1941.

According to Warner Bros records the film earned $3,821,000 domestically and $2,095,000 foreign.

For the majority of movie audiences, The Singing Fool became their first experience with a talking film, since few movie theaters had been equipped with a sound system in 1927. The film's positive reception was also viewed as a signifier that sound films were here to stay. "Here is complete vindication for the advocates of sound pictures", wrote Film Daily. "The Singing Fool is the finest example of sound pictures made to date." Mordaunt Hall of The New York Times wrote that the dialogue was "a little halting" and that Dunn was "not convincing", but recognized that the main point of interest in the film was "not in its transparent narrative, but in Mr. Jolson's inimitable singing", and on that basis it was "capital entertainment." John Mosher of The New Yorker also recommended the film, writing, "Fortunately, throughout this picture one has Al Jolson's own songs to listen to, for the story has been contrived to exploit to the full his special talents. Whenever the action begins to slump and lag, Al has only to step forward and do his stuff, and the day is saved." One trade paper commentator stated that The Singing Fool "will be to talking pictures what The Birth of a Nation has been to silent pictures".

For a time, the film also made Davey Lee, Jolson's 3 year old co-star, the most popular child star since Jackie Coogan. Lee was re-teamed with Jolson in Say It With Songs and starred in a few other films—including 1929's Sonny Boy—until his parents pulled him out of the movie business.

The film is recognized by American Film Institute in these lists:
 2004: AFI's 100 Years...100 Songs:	
 "Sonny Boy" – Nominated

Songs
Popular songs from the catalogs of DeSylva, Brown and Henderson, and Rose and Jolson were primarily used.

 "There's a Rainbow 'Round My Shoulder" – words and music by Billy Rose, Al Jolson and Dave Dreyer
 "Golden Gate" – words by Billy Rose and Dave Dreyer, music by Al Jolson and Joseph Meyer
 "I'm Sittin' on Top of the World" – words by Sam Lewis and Joe Young, music by Ray Henderson
 "It All Depends on You" – words and music by Lew Brown, B. G. DeSylva and Ray Henderson
 "Keep Smiling at Trouble" – words by Al Jolson and B. G. DeSylva, music by Lewis Gensler
 "Sonny Boy" – words and music by Lew Brown, B. G. DeSylva and Ray Henderson
"Sonny Boy" became the first song from a movie to sell over a million copies. It eventually sold over 3 million copies of sheet music, piano rolls and phonograph records.
 "The Spaniard That Blighted My Life" – Billy Merson (see below)
Source:

Deleted scenes
Al Jolson's rendition of "The Spaniard That Blighted My Life" is missing from extant prints of the film. This is due to a lawsuit initiated by the song's author, Billy Merson. Merson claimed that he, as a performer, owed his income to his own renditions of the song, and that Jolson's version would diminish his ability to earn a living. The song was removed from all prints of "The Singing Fool" shown in the United Kingdom. Unfortunately, the only surviving copies of the film are also from the U.K., hence are missing the song. These copies also have the majority of the original decorative Warner Brothers title cards replaced with simple British made ones which were used to remove Americanisms which the British would not understand or appreciate (a common practice during the silent era). Only the soundtrack survives on extant Vitaphone discs.

See also
List of early Warner Bros. talking features

References
Notes

Further reading
Staff (September 23, 1928) "Two Sound Pictures", The New York Times
Green, Stanley (1999) Hollywood Musicals Year by Year (2nd ed.), pub. Hal Leonard Corporation

External links

1928 films
1920s musical drama films
Warner Bros. films
American black-and-white films
1920s English-language films
Films directed by Lloyd Bacon
Transitional sound films
Films scored by Louis Silvers
American musical drama films
1928 drama films
Early sound films
Blackface minstrel shows and films
1920s American films